The 2014 Mae Lao earthquake occurred at  on May 5. One person was killed as a result.

Effects

The earthquake was a recorded as having a maximum intensity of strong (MMI VI), shaking both northern Thailand and Myanmar in the evening. People in many northern provinces (including Chiang Rai, Chiang Mai, and Lampang) sensed the quake. Windows, walls and roads as well as temples all suffered damage from the quake. Originally no casualties were reported, but later there were news reports of one death and several injuries. It was the strongest earthquake ever recorded in Thailand according to National Disaster Warning Center Director Somsak Khaosuwan.

Chiang Rai International Airport, located near the epicenter, immediately evacuated people from its terminal. Airport general manager Damrong Klongakara said the runway and flights had not been affected by the quake. Even so, the airport was closed for a while.

In Phan district of Chiang Rai, a road was split by serious cracks. A Buddha statue's head at the Udomwaree Temple fell off due to the quake and a residential building of the temple suffered exterior cracks and ceiling damage. Several other temples were also damaged.

A Chiang Rai police officer reported that goods in shops were scattered, cracks appeared in buildings, and some provincial roads proved to have "large cracks".

In Bangkok, tall buildings swayed as the earthquake occurred. Tremors were felt as far away as in Yangon, Myanmar.

Approximately one hundred repeated aftershocks were reported by the Asian Disaster Preparedness Center.

See also
 List of earthquakes in 2014
 List of earthquakes in Thailand

References

External links
 Likelihood of earthquakes in Thailand
 

Mae Lao earthquake
Earthquakes in Thailand
Chiang Rai province
2014 in Thailand